Following is a list of senators of Haute-Marne, people who have represented the department of Haute-Marne in the Senate of France.

Third Republic

Senators for Haute-Marne under the French Third Republic were:

 Louis Robert-Dehault (1876–1881)
 Félix Pélissier (1876–1887)
 Alexandre Donnot (1882–1886)
 Jean Danelle-Bernardin (1887–1916)
 Jean Darbot (1888–1920)
 Pierre Bizot de Fonteny (1888–1908)
 Léon Mougeot (1908–1920)
 Arthur Maranguet (1920–1924)
 Georges Quilliard (1920–1924)
 Émile Humblot (1920–1931)
 Joseph Courtier (1924–1933)
 Émile Cassez (1924–1940)
 Georges Ulmo (1932–1940)
 Raymond Martin (1933–1940)

Fourth Republic

Senators for Haute-Marne under the French Fourth Republic were:

 Georges Maire (1946–1955)
 Charles Barret (1948–1954)
 Edgard Pisani (1954–1959)
 Pierre Mathey (1955–1959)

Fifth Republic 
Senators for Haute-Marne under the French Fifth Republic were:

 Edgard Pisani (1959–1961) and (1974–1981)
 Pierre Mathey (1959–1972)
 Raymond Boin (1961–1974)
 René Rollin (1972–1974)
 Georges Berchet (1974–2001)
 Jacques-Richard Delong (1981–2001)

As of January 2018 the senators were:

 Charles Guené – Union for a Popular Movement (UMP) then The Republicans (LR) from 2001
 Bruno Sido – Union for a Popular Movement (UMP) then The Republicans (LR) from 2001

References

Sources

 
Lists of members of the Senate (France) by department